Adventist Health Portland (formerly Portland Adventist Medical Center), is a 302-bed hospital serving 900,000 residents on the east side of the Portland-Vancouver metropolitan area in the United States.  It is the primary teaching hospital of the Walla Walla University Nursing program.

History
In 1893, Lewis Belknap, M.D., headed west from Michigan where he had been a student at Dr. Harvey Kellogg's Battle Creek Sanitarium, intending to start a similar sanitarium on the West Coast. He arrived in Portland, Oregon penniless after having been robbed while in San Francisco. An Adventist minister by the name of Starbuck lent him the first month's rent for small house where Belknap set up a medical practice. Along with his wife, he operated a six patient facility on East Twelfth St. in Portland.

The couple soon relocated to the Reed Mansion, which provided them with 20 patient beds, a surgical ward, office, kitchen and dining room. The stable was re-modeled into treatment rooms and a nurse's dormitory and in 1896, the Belknaps moved from the area and the Seventh-day Adventist (SDA) church obtained the facility. The church added a two-year nurses training program and formed a health food company in 1897.

In 1902, the need for expansion relocated the sanitarium to the base of Mt. Tabor. There a four-story wood building provided for 75 patients and was easily accessible from the train station a few blocks away. William Holden, M.D., joined the staff in 1903 and soon took the position of medical director, which he would hold till his death in 1955. It was under his direction that the hospital transitioned from a long-term care facility to a surgical/medical facility.

In the late 1920s the fire marshal condemned the top two floors of the Mt. Tabor facilities' building because it did not meet fire code. Rather than operate in limited quarters, the hospital board decided to raze the building and rebuild. It was closed on September 21, 1920, and reconstruction on the original site was completed in the spring of 1922. This modern facility was equipped with private rooms that had hot and cold running water, the first of its kind in Oregon. Dr. Holden performed the first surgery, an emergency appendectomy, on April 21, 1922, while painters and plasterers were still working the interior. Two years after the new building was completed, more space was needed. A nurse's dormitory was added in 1928 and two new wings in 1949 and 1964.

During the 1950s and 1960s new additions were made including training programs in medical technology, radiological technology, practical nursing and a pediatrics department. In the mid-1960s it was determined that expansion and relocation was again necessary. A lack of funds prompted the hospital board to turn to the public for support. The $2.5 million expansion also received aid from federal grants and the Seventh-day Adventist church. Administrators purchased the  Glendover Golf Course planning to reserve  for the hospital and redesigning the remaining land into a 27-hole championship golf course and driving range. Controversy over this plan arose resulting in the county purchasing the land back from the hospital and a new site was purchased on SE Market Street.

During the construction plans, the desire to be linked with other denominational health care facilities prompted Adventist Medical Center (AMC), as it was now known, to join Adventist Health on February 8, 1973.

Groundbreaking for the new hospital took place in 1974 at the site of the former Morningside Hospital. A physician's office building opened in 1976 followed by the hospitals grand-opening in 1977. "Operation Keep Step," consisting of eleven ambulances and five wheelchair cars transferred all patients, equipment and staff without seriously disrupting hospital services. AMC moved 204 beds to the new facility immediately while 72 remained at the Mt. Tabor site until the north wing was completed the following year. In 1978, the construction of a residence hall and classroom building for the Walla Walla College School of Nursing completed the hospital

References

External links

 

Hospitals in Portland, Oregon
Hospital buildings completed in 1902
Adventist Health
1893 establishments in Oregon